Rabid Records is a Swedish record label founded in 1998 by members of Honey Is Cool. Today the label is operated by Karin Dreijer and Olof Dreijer of the synthpop duo The Knife, as well as Frau Rabid. The label rarely releases anything other than works by The Knife, but it is currently the home of Jenny Wilson, First Aid Kit, and DJ Coolof (the stage name of Olof Dreijer). In the past, the label has put out albums and EPs by Honey Is Cool, Monster & Maskiner, Rockmonster, and Calle P.

Catalogue

See also 
 List of record labels

External links
 Official site

Swedish record labels
Record labels established in 1998
Indie rock record labels